The Plymouth Howler is a  roadster concept car designed and built by Plymouth. It was first presented at the 1999 SEMA Show. It has been described as a redesigned Prowler with increased cargo space compared to previous Prowler models and has 4.7L V8 engine. The engine is mated to a five speed manual transmission, instead of the Prowler's four speed automatic. This freed up some room in the undercarriage to enlarge the gas tank for the thirstier V8. The Howler also has a removable hardtop instead of the traditional ragtop of the Prowler. The top is manually removed, and can be stored in a compartment behind the seats.

References 

Howler
Retro-style automobiles